Tom Baluchan (also Romanized as Tom Balūchān; also known as Tonb Balūchān and Towm-e Balūchān) is a village in Band-e Zarak Rural District, in the Central District of Minab County, Hormozgan Province, Iran. At the 2006 census, its population was 195, in 46 families.

References 

Populated places in Minab County